Sennen (Cornish: Sen Senan or Sen Senana) is a coastal civil parish and a village in Cornwall, England, United Kingdom. Sennen village is situated approximately eight miles (13 km) west-southwest of Penzance.

Sennen parish is bounded by the sea to the west and bordered by the parishes of St Just to the north, St Buryan to the east, St Levan to the south. The Longships, a group of rocky islets situated off Lands End, are also within the parish. The main settlements are Churchtown, Trevescan, Carn Towan, Sennen Cove and Land's End.

For the purposes of local government Sennen elects a parish council every four years.  The main local authority is Cornwall Council.

Geography
Sennen parish is situated at the western tip of the Penwith peninsula and is exposed to prevailing westerly winds from the Atlantic. Geologically, it is located on the Land's End Granite, one of the five major granite batholiths that make up the spine of Cornwall (see Geology of Cornwall). Consequently, the parish has a bare moorland-like character with very few trees and no woodland.

The population was 829 at the 2001 census.

Below the village is the harbour settlement of Sennen Cove.

Church

Sennen parish church is dedicated to St Sinninus but has also been dedicated to St John the Baptist. There has been a church here since at least the 15th century. A visit by members of the Penzance Natural History and Antiquarian Society on their annual excursion in August 1893 translated a Latin inscription on a stone at the base of the font as ″In the year of the Lord 1441 [2, 3, or 4], this Church was dedicated on [the festival of] the beheading of St John the Baptist″. The present church has a chancel and nave, a south aisle and a north transept. A wall-painting depicting two round embattled towers was uncovered during restoration in 1867. There is also a headless alabaster figure representing the Virgin Mary in the transept. The church has a three-stage battlemented tower housing a ring of three bells.

There are five Cornish crosses in the parish. One is at Escalls and another at Sennen Green. Trevilley cross is one of only two crosses with a crucifixus figure on a cross carved onto the stone (there is a cross on the other side of the head). A cross on the churchyard wall came from a site near the Giant's Stone. A fine cross in the cemetery adjoining the churchyard was found in use as a footbridge near Trevear and moved to the churchyard in 1878. About 1890 it was moved to its present position.

Old customs
On the old Christmas Day in the 1830s (and before) the farmers of St Sennen assembled for the festivities. One of the dishes was a pie made from 24 blackbirds. At midnight the young men went out to see the ‘cattle kneel’ and on their return they threw rushes onto the fire. The number of crackles, or the particular form assumed, told the fortunes of those who threw them into the fire.

Notable residents
William John Hocking of the Royal Mint

Gallery

References

External links

 
 Cornwall Record Office Online Catalogue for Sennen

 
Villages in Cornwall
Civil parishes in Cornwall
Beaches of Penwith